WYIS (1410 AM) is a radio station broadcasting a classic hits format, simulcasting WYSC 102.7 FM McRae, Georgia. Licensed to McRae, Georgia, USA, the station is owned by Cinecom Broadcasting Systems, Inc.

References

External links

YIS
YIS
Radio stations established in 1957
1957 establishments in Georgia (U.S. state)